Charles Bonifacio is a Canadian animator who worked on Nelvana productions such as Rock and Rule, Inspector Gadget, Star Wars: Ewoks, the Care Bears television series and the first two Care Bears movies of the 1980s. He was director of animation on The Care Bears Movie and on Care Bears Movie II: A New Generation. In the 1990s, he worked on FernGully: The Last Rainforest and Disney's Mulan.

Bonifacio worked on other animated films and specials including The Land Before Time, Rock-a-Doodle, All Dogs Go to Heaven, Once Upon a Forest, A Cosmic Christmas, all three early films of Strawberry Shortcake, Watership Down (uncredited), Easter Fever, Intergalactic Thanksgiving, The Devil and Daniel Mouse, Romie-0 and Julie-8 and Tarzan II.

In the late 1980s and 1990s, Charlie taught classical animation at Sheridan College. Clive A. Smith, one of Nelvana's founders, recruited Bonifacio from Sheridan College among a host of young animators from that institution, one of the few animation schools in the world at the time.

Bonifacio has also worked on the Disney animated films The Hunchback of Notre Dame, Mulan, Lilo & Stitch, Return to Never Land, Tarzan II and Brother Bear 2.

References

External links 

 

Canadian animated film directors
Canadian storyboard artists
Canadian television directors
Living people
Walt Disney Animation Studios people
Year of birth missing (living people)